Slovakia competed at the 2018 Winter Paralympics in Pyeongchang, South Korea, held between 9–18 March 2018.

Medalists

Alpine skiing

Men

Women

Wheelchair curling

Summary

Round-robin
Slovakia has a bye in draws 1, 3, 8, 11, 13 and 15.

Draw 2
Saturday, 10 March, 19:35

Draw 4
Sunday, 11 March, 14:35

Draw 5
Sunday, 11 March, 19:35

Draw 6
Monday, 12 March, 09:35

Draw 7
Monday, 12 March, 14:35

Draw 9
Tuesday, 13 March, 09:35

Draw 10
Tuesday, 13 March, 14:35

Draw 12
Wednesday, 14 March, 9:35

Draw 14
Wednesday, 14 March, 19:35

Draw 16
Thursday, 15 March, 14:35

Draw 17
Thursday, 15 March, 19:35

See also
Slovakia at the Paralympics
Slovakia at the 2018 Winter Olympics

References

Nations at the 2018 Winter Paralympics
2018
Winter Paralympics